The 2014 Fordham Rams men's soccer team represented the Fordham University during the 2014 NCAA Division I men's soccer season.

Roster 

As of July 13, 2014

Competitions

Preseason

Regular season

A10 Table

Results

A-10 Tournament

NCAA Tournament

References 

Fordham Rams
2014
Fordham Rams, Soccer Men
Fordham Rams